George Kemp may refer to:
 George Kemp (baseball), American baseball player
 George Stephen Kemp, electrical engineer and assistant to Guglielmo Marconi
 George Meikle Kemp (1795–1844), Scottish carpenter/joiner, draughtsman, and self-taught architect
 George Kemp, 1st Baron Rochdale (1866–1945), British aristocrat
 George Hubert Kemp (1897–1918), World War I British flying ace

See also
George Kempe